Atomic may refer to:

 Of or relating to the atom, the smallest particle of a chemical element that retains its chemical properties
 Atomic physics, the study of the atom
 Atomic Age, also known as the "Atomic Era"
 Atomic scale, distances comparable to the dimensions of an atom
 Atom (order theory), in mathematics
 Atomic (cocktail), a champagne cocktail
 Atomic (magazine), an Australian computing and technology magazine
 Atomic Skis, an Austrian ski producer

Music 
 Atomic (band), a Norwegian jazz quintet
 Atomic (Lit album), 2001
 Atomic (Mogwai album), 2016
 Atomic, an album by Rockets, 1982
 "Atomic" (song), by Blondie, 1979
 "Atomic", a song by Tiger Army from Tiger Army III: Ghost Tigers Rise

See also 

 
 
 Atom (disambiguation)
 Atomicity (database systems)
 Nuclear (disambiguation)
 Atomism, philosophy about the basic building blocks of reality
 Atomic City (disambiguation)
 Atomic formula, a formula without subformulas
 Atomic number, the number of protons found in the nucleus of an atom
 Atomic chess, a chess variant
 Atomic coffee machine, a 1950s stovetop coffee machine
 Atomic operation, in computer science
 Atomic TV, a channel launched in 1997 in Poland
 Nuclear power
 Nuclear weapon